Rick Santorum presidential campaign may refer to:

 Rick Santorum presidential campaign, 2012
 Rick Santorum presidential campaign, 2016